Cadair Bronwen is a mountain in North Wales and forms part of the Berwyn range. To the south are the higher Berwyn summits, including Cadair Berwyn. To the north lies Moel yr Henfaes and Moel Fferna, which top the north end of the Berwyn range. Cadair Bronwen used to be accompanied by a Nuttall top, Cadair Bronwen North-East Top, 700 m (2297 ft). This top was deleted in 2007 after re-surveying.

Its summit is the highest point in the unitary authority of Wrexham.

References

External links
www.geograph.co.uk : photos of Cadair Bronwen and surrounding area

Hewitts of Wales
Nuttalls
Mountains and hills of Wrexham County Borough
Mountains and hills of Denbighshire